Gyrista is a phylum of heterokont protists containing three diverse groups: the mostly photosynthetic Ochrophyta, the parasitic Pseudofungi, and the recently described group of nanoflagellates known as Bigyromonada. Members of this phylum are characterized by the presence of a helix or a double helix/ring system in the ciliary transition region.

Phylogeny

Gyrista was seen in 2017 as the sister group to phylum Bigyra, which contains the Sagenista and Opalozoa. Together, Gyrista and Bigyra form the superphylum Stramenopiles or Heterokonta.

A phylogenetic analysis in 2022 recovered a monophyletic Bigyromonada sister to Pseudofungi. The "Bigyra" is paraphyletic:

Classification
The 2018 revised taxonomy of Gyrista is the following, with the inclusion of new ochrophyte classes described in 2020 and 2021:
Subphylum Bigyromonada 
Class Developea  [=Bigyromonadea ]
Class Pirsonea 
Subphylum Pseudofungi  [=Heterokontimycotina ]
Class Hyphochytrea  [=Hyphochytriomycota ]
Class Oomycetes  [=Oomycota ; Peronosporomycetes ]
Subphylum Ochrophytina  [=Heterokontophyta ; Stramenochromes ]
Infraphylum Chrysista 
Superclass Limnistia 
Class Eustigmatophyceae 
Class Chrysomonadea  [=Chrysophyceae ]
Class Picophagea  [=Synchromophyceae ]
Superclass Raphidoistia 
Class Raphidomonadea 
Subclass Raphidophycidae 
Subclass Raphopoda 
Superclass Fucistia 
Class Aurophyceae 
Subclass Aurearenophycidae 
Subclass Phaeothamniophycidae 
Class Chrysomerophyceae 
Class Chrysoparadoxophyceae 
Class Phaeosacciophyceae 
Class Schizocladiophyceae 
Class Phaeophyceae  [=Fucophyceae ; Melanophyceae ]
Subclass Discosporangiophycidae
Subclass Ishigeophycidae 
Subclass Dictyotophycidae 
Subclass Fucophycidae 
Class Xanthophyceae  [=Tribophyceae ; Heterokontae ]
Infraphylum Diatomista 
Superclass Hypogyrista 
Class Dictyochophyceae  [=Dictyochia ; Alophycidae ]
Subclass Pedinellia  [=Actinochrysophyceae ; Axodines]
Subclass Pelagophycidae 
?Subclass Sulcophycidae  – ?Sulcochrysis
Class Pinguiophyceae 
Superclass Khakista 
Class Bolidophyceae
Class Diatomeae [=Bacillariophyceae]
Subclass Corethrophycidae 
Subclass Rhizosoleniophycidae 
Subclass Eucentricophycidae 
Subclass Bacillariophycidae [=Pennatia ; =Pennatophycidae]
Ochrophytina incertae sedis
Class Olisthodiscophyceae

Notes

References

Heterokonts